Film Fun was a Canadian children's television miniseries on animation filmmaking which aired on CBC Television from 1974 to 1976.

Premise
This Ottawa-produced programme featured the techniques of filmmaking for a young audience, focusing on animation. Briam Smyth hosted the series with filmmaking siblings Bryan and Nancy Stoller. Guests such as Don Arioli (National Film Board of Canada), Ben McPeek (composer), Ken Perkins (Winnipeg animator), Sebatian (Montreal film producer). One location segment featured computer animation at the National Research Council.

Scheduling
This five-episode half-hour series aired Wednesdays at 5:00 p.m. (Eastern) between 4 December 1974 and 15 January 1975. Episodes were rebroadcast on Tuesdays at 5:00 p.m. from 5 to 26 October 1976.

References

External links
 

CBC Television original programming
1974 Canadian television series debuts
1976 Canadian television series endings